The Kombolcha massacre is a mass extrajudicial and summary execution of over 100 Amhara civilian youths by the Tigray Forces in South Wollo, in the Amhara Region of Ethiopia. Bodies of the victims set on fire at a business compound in the town. Kombolcha was described as a key warring location and is found on the A2 highway leading into Addis Ababa with speculation of TPLF advance to the Capital City. Looting of aid, and private and public properties was also reported. Kombolcha town is the industrial hub of the Amhara region.

Background 

TPLF was the minority-dominant group in Ethiopian politics for 27 years. Regime changes occurred in 2018 in which the TPLF lost control of federal positions while holding power in the Tigray Region. The power struggle between Abiy Ahmed’s regime and the TPLF led to the Northern-Ethiopia war that started following the federal Northern Command attack by TPLF in November 2020. As the war prolonged, TPLF invaded the Amhara and the Afar regions in July 2021, reportedly massacring civilians and causing severe destructions.

Massacre 
Kombolcha was occupied by the TPLF forces from late October through the end of 2021. The massacre of Amhara civilians occurred on 30 October 2021, following the infiltration of the attackers into the town. Residents reported chaotic nights and gunshots. The massacre of the 100 Amhara youths occurred after a year of continuous fighting in the Tigray War, and with the invasion of Tigray forces into the Amhara region. Frightened residents reported that they had spent the day in their homes as gunfire shook the town. Members of the TPLF shot and summarily executed the youths, and reportedly set the victims on fire at a compound of a Turkey-based company. AAA identified partial victim's list and published testimonies.

Looting and ransacking 
Tigray forces reportedly looted and ransacked foreign aid essentials, and private and public properties, including the WFP food supplies for malnourished children in Kombolcha. WFP reported that it suspended distributing food aid after Tigray gunmen looted its warehouses, and stole large quantities of essential food supplies while holding aid staff at gunpoint. A UN spokesperson also communicated another mass looting in the town, and the additional hijacking of 18 WFP aid trucks by the TPLF forces. The government reported looting and damages to these manufacturing industries in Kombolcha and Dessie: 10 food processing, 11 leather and textile factories, 3 metal processing factories, 11 Agro-processing, and 10 chemical industries. TPLF also destroyed infrastructure and facilities such as schools and health stations.

IDP crisis 
The humanitarian crisis remains dire for Amhara IDPs. Kombolcha and Dessie were already the refugee destinations for millions of Amhara IDPs who fled North Wollo from TPLF attackers. AAA reported the dire situation of the IDPs sheltered in the surroundings of public schools. Civic groups expressed concern on the lack of support from government bodies— stated that the IDPs had not been given attention in both Dessie and Kombolcha.

Reactions

State of Emergency 

The November 2021 state of emergency was declared during the TPLF invasion of Kombolcha and after civilians massacre.

Calls for evacuation 
The UN and some foreign diplomats urged citizens and families to leave Ethiopia with the state of emergency following occupation of Kombolcha and the killing of the 100 Amhara youths.

 Government of Ethiopia: Senior Ethiopian officials described the calls for evacuation as disinformation and propaganda. Ethiopia accused the United States for spreading 'false information' about war. 
 Zambia: President Hakainde Hichilema ordered the diplomats and their families to evacuate, and repatriated 31 workers from the embassy in Addis Ababa
 United States: Department of State and the U.S. embassy in Addis Ababa advised its citizens to leave the country "as soon as possible", and set-up a task force.
 Canada: The Foreign Minister urged citizens to leave Ethiopia immediately, and communicated the security as "rapidly deteriorating".
 United Kingdom: The Africa minister warned against travel to the whole country, and called for British nationals to leave "now while commercial flights are readily available".
 France: The French embassy emailed its citizens and called for  "All French nationals are formally urged to leave the country without delay".
 Germany: Germany's foreign minister called for its nationals to depart on the "first available commercial flights".
 UN: UN security asked the organization to "co-ordinate the evacuation and departure no later than 25 November 2021".

Retreat and withdrawal 
Reports covered that Kombolcha was recaptured by the Ethiopian Federal army and the Amhara forces, and TPLF retreated out of the town— reversing TPLF's short-lived gains on the war front. TPLF denied defeat and carrying out the massacre.

See also 
 Chenna massacre
 Galikoma massacre
 Kobo massacre
 Mai Kadra massacre

References 

Massacres in Ethiopia
2021 massacres of the Tigray War
Massacres committed by the Tigray Defense Forces
Extrajudicial killings in Ethiopia
September 2021 crimes in Africa
Amhara Region
Massacres of men
Massacres of Amhara people
2021 murders in Ethiopia